Oriola Sunday (born 18 April 2003) is a Nigerian footballer who plays as a forward for Tokushima Vortis.

Career statistics

Club

Notes

References

2003 births
Living people
Nigerian footballers
Association football forwards
J2 League players
Tokushima Vortis players
Nigerian expatriate footballers
Expatriate footballers in Japan
Nigerian expatriate sportspeople in Japan